Petropavlovsky is a crater on the far side of the Moon. It is attached to the southern rim of the slightly larger crater Razumov, intruding slightly into the interior. Just to the west is the crater Frost, along the southern rim of the walled plain Landau.

This is a moderately eroded feature, with a worn outer rim that is marked by several lesser impacts. A merged pair of small craters cuts across the northwestern rim and inner wall, and another craterlet lies along the southeast rim. The interior floor is relatively level, except for a double central peak formation at the midpoint.

The crater was named after Boris Sergeevich Petropavlovsky, a Soviet rocket pioneer.

Satellite craters
By convention these features are identified on lunar maps by placing the letter on the side of the crater midpoint that is closest to Petropavlovskiy.

References

 
 
 
 
 
 
 
 
 
 
 
 

Impact craters on the Moon